Coleville is an unincorporated community and census-designated place (CDP) in Mono County, California, United States. The population was 419 at the 2020 census,  down from 495 at the 2010 census.

The ZIP Code is 96107, and the community is inside area codes 442 and 760.

History
The first post office at Coleville was established in 1868. The name honors Cornelius Cole, a United States senator. On June 1, 2007, the Larson fire threatened Coleville while burning  and causing US$3,000,000 damage.

Coleville is the hometown of General John Abizaid and the birthplace of trick shooter Lillian Smith.

Geography
Coleville is one of the three northernmost communities in Mono County. It is bordered to the north by Topaz and to the south by Walker. U.S. Route 395 passes through the town, leading north  to Carson City, Nevada, and southeast  to Bridgeport, the Mono county seat. According to the Mono County government, Antelope Valley, including Coleville, is expected to see significant population growth. 

Climate
The region experiences warm (but not hot) and dry summers, with no average monthly temperatures above .  According to the Köppen Climate Classification system, Coleville has a warm-summer Mediterranean climate, abbreviated "Csb" on climate maps.

Fire protection district
Coleville is served by the Antelope Valley Fire Protection District, founded in 1947 and covering  of the Antelope Valley. The District maintains a  training facility in Coleville.

Water district
Coleville is served by the Antelope Valley Water District, which was formed in 1961.

Education
Coleville is in the Eastern Sierra Unified School District. An elementary school and a high school (Coleville High School) are located in Coleville.

Due to Coleville's geographic isolation from other California schools, Coleville High competes in the Nevada Interscholastic Activities Association along with four other similarly-isolated California schools.

Coleville also has a public library.

Demographics

The 2010 United States Census reported that Coleville had a population of 495. The racial makeup of Coleville was 386 (78.0%) White, 6 (1.2%) African American, 10 (2.0%) Native American, 8 (1.6%) Asian, 0 (0.0%) Pacific Islander, 62 (12.5%) from other races, and 23 (4.6%) from two or more races. Hispanic or Latino of any race were 110 persons (22.2%).

The Census reported that 495 people (100% of the population) lived in households, 0 (0%) lived in non-institutionalized group quarters, and 0 (0%) were institutionalized.

There were 171 households, out of which 90 (52.6%) had children under the age of 18 living in them, 129 (75.4%) were opposite-sex married couples living together, 8 (4.7%) had a female householder with no husband present, 4 (2.3%) had a male householder with no wife present.  There were 6 (3.5%) unmarried opposite-sex partnerships, and 2 (1.2%) same-sex married couples or partnerships. 25 households (14.6%) were made up of individuals, and 8 (4.7%) had someone living alone who was 65 years of age or older. The average household size was 2.89.  There were 141 families (82.5% of all households); the average family size was 3.23.

The population was spread out, with 167 people (33.7%) under the age of 18, 66 people (13.3%) aged 18 to 24, 170 people (34.3%) aged 25 to 44, 60 people (12.1%) aged 45 to 64, and 32 people (6.5%) who were 65 years of age or older.  The median age was 25.7 years. For every 100 females, there were 93.4 males.  For every 100 females age 18 and over, there were 101.2 males.

There were 201 housing units at an average density of 14.6 per square mile (5.6/km), of which 48 (28.1%) were owner-occupied, and 123 (71.9%) were occupied by renters. The homeowner vacancy rate was 2.0%; the rental vacancy rate was 4.7%.  107 people (21.6% of the population) lived in owner-occupied housing units and 388 people (78.4%) lived in rental housing units.

Government

See also
 Topaz Lake

References

External links
 Coleville Tourism Site
 Mono County Demographics

Census-designated places in Mono County, California
Census-designated places in California